Bruce Coville's Book of Monsters is the first in a series of "Book of" anthologies edited by Bruce Coville. It was first published in September 1993 by Scholastic Publishing. It is collection of stories aimed at juvenile readers that advertises itself as "scary", but in fact contains a wide variety of stories and genres such as science fiction, horror, fantasy, and realistic with some supernatural elements. In this aspect the "Book of" anthologies differ from many other scary anthologies for juvenile readers which often lean towards straight horror.

Overview
Bruce Coville followed-up his popular first book with a line of other supernatural or sci-fi subject matters for several follow-ups. After six volumes in the initial "Book of" series, the books were popular enough to warrant sequels to each volume. Coville also used the extended series to publish a five-part story, "The Monsters of Morley Manor." The book series was published from 1993 to 1997.

Books
{| class="wikitable" style="width:100%;"
|-
!  style="width:30px; background:#AE1C26; color:#fff;"|# !!  style="background:#AE1C26;color:#fff;"|Title !!  style="width:160px; background:#AE1C26; color:#fff;"|Author !! style="background:#AE1C26;color:#fff;"|Original published date !! style="background:#AE1C26;color:#fff;"|Pages !!  style="width:120px; background:#AE1C26;"|ISBN

|}

See also
Scary Stories to Tell in the Dark
Tales for the Midnight Hour
Short & Shivery

References 

Series of children's books
Horror anthologies
1993 anthologies
Children's short story collections
American children's books
1993 children's books
Works by Bruce Coville